This is a list of the equipment used by the Dominican Army.

References 

Military of the Dominican Republic

Dominica